I.I.M.U.N. (India's International Movement to Unite Nations, also known as: Indian International Model United Nations or IIMUN) is a youth organisation comprising 26,000 young organisers who put together student conferences in 220 cities and 35 countries, and work with over 7,500 schools impacting 10 million students. The organization simulates the workings of Indian Parliament and multi-lateral organisations for school students to engage them in debates about international relations, current affairs and world politics. The aim of the organisation is to get Indian students between 13 and 19 to become global citizens with an Indian mind-set.

History 
I.I.M.U.N. was founded in 2011 by Rishabh.S.Shah, with its first conference being held from 2–5 August 2012 at the Mumbai World Trade Centre.

Conferences 
I.I.M.U.N. held a conference inside the United Nations headquarters in New York City in August 2016, and it has since become annual. They have conducted the world's largest Mock UNO conference in Mumbai with 7,500 students participating in it. Every year, annually in August, the organisation puts together its yearly finale event which has taken place in Aamby Valley City, Taj Mahal Palace Hotel & the World Trade Centre. Winning students from across the country and globe come to participate in the same, which is called I.I.M.U.N. Championship Conference. The students learn about yoga and Indian best practices in the mornings, followed by debating on issues after which speakers come and engage with them. The conferences are held in cities in India ranging from Srinagar to Kanyakumari & Port Blair to Kohima, countries ranging from Japan to Uruguay, Poland to South Africa.

Issues discussed 
One of the central topics being discussed in all conferences has been Security Council reform to get India a permanent seat in the council, which is a topic lobbied for by the Indian government in the actual United Nations. Other issues that are discussed range from debating the 26/11 terror attacks, ISIS, environmental issues, human rights concerns, and economic topics such as demonetisation. The organisation also simulates councils based on Indian history and polity.

Initiatives 
Find a bed, an initiative during the COVID-19 pandemic, tackled the problem of finding COVID beds for mildly symptomatic and asymptomatic patients in India. Popular celebrities from Karan Johar, Gauri Khan, Kriti Sanon, Kartik Aryan, Sania Mirza, Shashi Tharoor amongst others supported the cause. However, the initiative also came under criticism for some of the pictures of ambassadors not being "proper".

References 

Model United Nations
Student organisations in India
2011 establishments in Maharashtra
Student organizations established in 2011